Richard King, Rich King, or Dick King may refer to:

Arts and entertainment
Richard King (artist) (1907–1974), Irish stained glass artist and illustrator
Richard King (sound designer), American film sound designer and editor
Ricky King (born 1946), German guitarist
Dick King-Smith (1922–2011), author of children's fiction

Military and politics
Dick King (politician) (1934–2018), American politician
Sir Richard King, 1st Baronet (1730–1806), British admiral, Commodore Governor for Newfoundland and Labrador
Sir Richard King, 2nd Baronet (1774–1834), son of the above and British admiral who served at the Battle of Trafalgar
Richard King (MP) (died c. 1640), English lawyer and politician who sat in the House of Commons between 1640 and 1643

Sports
Dick King (American football) (1895–1930), All-American and early professional football player
Rich King (basketball) (born 1969), American basketball player
Richard King (baseball) (1904–1966), Negro league baseball player
Richard King (English cricketer) (born 1984), former English cricketer
Richard King (New Zealand cricketer) (born 1973), New Zealand cricketer
Richard King (footballer) (born 2001), Jamaican association footballer

Other
Dick King (1813–1871), English trader and colonist
Richard King (entrepreneur) (1824–1885), entrepreneur and founder of the King Ranch in South Texas
Richard King (priest) (1871–1958), Dean of Derry, 1921–1946
Richard King (traveller) (1811–1876), English surgeon, Arctic traveler and early ethnological writer
Richard E. King, religion professor
Richard King Mellon (1899–1970), American financier
Richard King, of Richard and William King, an English merchant company
Richard King, alias used by Robert Hoagland since 2013
 Richard King, chairman of the APY lands land council, South Australia, since 2015

See also
King (surname)
Rich King (disambiguation)
King Richard (disambiguation)